Nikola Nedeljković (born 24 December 1996) is a Serbian football midfielder who plays for Vodojaža.

References

External links
 
 

1996 births
Living people
Sportspeople from Kragujevac
Association football midfielders
Serbian footballers
FK Radnički 1923 players
Serbian First League players
Serbian SuperLiga players